Phongthep Kradonchamnan is a Thai Phleng phuea chiwit singer.

Life
His nickname is Moo ("Pig"), and he was born in Nakhon Ratchasima Province on September 18, 1953. In 1975, he started his career as an entertainer with the first generation members of Phleng phuea chiwit band, Caravan. He became a solo singer in 1983.

Entertainers
He started his career as a solo singer in 1983. His first album was Huay Taleang, and he has been popular since. Included in his first album were several popular songs such as Tang Kae, Ton Kab Kee, Fon Nang Jang Hay, Ko Ra Cha, Khon Kab Maa, Kid Tueng Ban, Nam Ta Hoy Tak, Lom Ram Poey, etc. Most of his songs were composed by him. The lyrics are more poetry like, some are very political , and advocate for working class and poverty, which later gave him the nickname Farmer's Poet.

Discography

Albums
 Huay Taleang (ห้วยแถลง) (1983)
 Dieaw (เดี่ยว) (1985)
 I am Isan (ไอแอมอีสาน) (1986)
 Mun Dee (มันดี) (1986)
 Trong Sen Khob Faa (ตรงเส้นขอบฟ้า) (1986)
 Yim Ngao Ngao (ยิ้มเหงาๆ) (1988)
 khon Jon Run Mai (คนจนรุ่นใหม่) (1990)
 Jor Poe Loe Jeen Pon Lao (จ.ป.ล. จีนปนลาว) (1991)
 Khon Thee Rao Rak (คนที่เรารัก) (1992)
 Supermarket (ซุเปอร์มาร์เกต) (1994)
 Maa Hai Ban Kert (มาให้บ้านเกิด) (1996)
 Dok Nguea Phuea Chiwit (ดอกเหงื่อเพื่อชีวิต) (1998)
 Jao Sao Phee Suea (เจ้าสาวผีเสื้อ) (2000)
 Khai Ngwea Song Kwai Riean (ขายงัวส่งควายเรียน) (2006)
 Mon Kan Mueng (มนต์การเมือง) (2010)

References

1953 births
Living people
Phongthep Kradonchamnan
Phongthep Kradonchamnan